Frances Alice Blogg Chesterton (28 June 1869 – 12 December 1938) was an English author of verse, songs and school drama. She was the wife of G. K. Chesterton and had a large role in his career as amanuensis and personal manager.

Early life
Frances was born on 28 June 1869, the first of seven children of George William Blogg and Blanche Keymer. Frances’ mother taught her and her sisters to think independently, having them attend London's first kindergarten. She was educated at a progressive Ladies' School in Fitzroy Square run by Rosalie and Minna Praetorius, followed by Notting Hill High School. Her father died when she was fourteen years old. Later, she attended St. Stephen's College for two years as a pupil teacher. She taught Sunday school at an Anglican church in Bedford Park. Here, she became very involved in her faith by reading the Bible and devoting herself to the Saints. In 1895, Frances began working as a secretary and administrator at the Parent's National Educational Union. She worked here, planning and organising conferences, giving speeches, and editing their publications until her marriage to G.K. Chesterton.

Marriage 
She first met Gilbert Keith Chesterton in 1896 and married him on 28 June 1901 in St Mary Abbots, Kensington. Throughout their marriage, Frances encouraged his writing. Because of her passion for her husband, she worked as a manager, keeping his appointments' diary and accounts, hiring his typists, and negotiating on his behalf with publishers.

G. K. Chesterton admired Frances' faith and how she lived it out by reading the Bible, teaching Sunday school, and taking care of the sick and elderly. Frances introduced him to the Holy Trinity and Jesus. In G.K. Chesterton's poem, The Ballad of the White Horse, he gives Frances the recognition of this impact in his life, showing that she was the reason he converted:"Therefore I bring these rhymes to you  Who brought the cross to me." 

Frances was received into the Catholic Church on 1 November 1926, four years after her husband. Frances' faith was tested while coping with her brother's suicide, yet the Chestertons helped one another through hard times to maintain their relationship with Jesus.

Each Christmas she wrote a poem for their Christmas card, one of which, "How far is it to Bethlehem?", was later published as the hymn "Is It Far To Bethlehem?".

Death and legacy
In 1909 the couple moved to Beaconsfield, Buckinghamshire, where they lived until their deaths. She was widowed on 14 June 1936, and died on 12 December 1938.

The Charity of Frances Alice Chesterton was established by her will and was registered as a charity in 1965 (registered charity number 252034). It supports the work of the Roman Catholic Church in the parish of Beaconsfield.

Works 

Plays

 The Children's Crusade
 Sir Cleges
The Christmas Gift
Piers Plowman's Pilgrimage
The Three Kings
Legends of Gods and Saints

Christmas Card Poetry
Christmas 1911 In Her Warm Arms Our Lady
Christmas 1912 Upon a Little Bank of Grass
Christmas 1917 How Far Is It To Bethlehem?
Christmas 1918 Seen and Unseen
Christmas 1921 The Beast of Burden
Christmas 1922 A Ballade of Christmas
Christmas 1923 The Crusaders’ Carol
Christmas 1925 The Carol of Three Brothers
Christmas 1926 A Lullaby Carol
Christmas 1927 Gold, Frankincense, and Myrrh
Christmas 1928 What Manner of Salutation?
Christmas 1929 Sed Ex Deo Nati Sunt
Christmas 1930 The Cradle of the Winds (Notre Dame)
Christmas 1931 The Lowly Gifts
Christmas 1932 And It Was Winter
Christmas 1933 Lux Mundi
Christmas 1934 In Coelo Et Terra
Christmas 1937 Now Is Our Salvation

Music
Words to Geoffrey Shaw's "A Lullaby Carol"

Further reading
 Nancy Carpentier Brown: The woman who was Chesterton : the life of Frances Chesterton, wife of English author G.K. Chesterton, Charlotte, NC : ACS Books, [2015] [2015],

References

1869 births
1938 deaths
20th-century British writers
People educated at Notting Hill & Ealing High School
Converts to Roman Catholicism from Anglicanism
Amanuenses